The following television stations broadcast on digital channel 45 in the United States:

 K45KS-D in Billings, Montana, to move to channel 19
 W45DN-D in Washington, D.C., to move to channel 10, on virtual channel 46
 WJOS-LD in Pomeroy, Ohio, to move to channel 31

The following television stations, which are no longer licensed, formerly broadcast on digital channel 45 in the United States:
 K45AF-D in Parachute, etc., Colorado
 K45AU-D in Follett, Texas
 K45DS-D in Freshwater, etc., California
 K45DY-D in New Mobeetie, Texas
 K45GD-D in Romeo, etc., Colorado
 K45IA-D in Rock Springs, Wyoming
 K45KT-D in Sargents, Colorado
 K45KX-D in Weed, California
 KCDR-LD in Cedar Rapids, Iowa
 KHPB-CD in Bastrop, Texas
 KLHU-CD in Lake Havasu City, Arizona
 KMDK-LD in Jonesboro, Arkansas
 W45DI-D in Juana Diaz, Puerto Rico
 W45DJ-D in Panama City, Florida
 W45ED-D in Clarksdale, Mississippi
 WKDH in Houston, Mississippi
 WMUN-CD in Mineola, New York

References

45 digital